Arturo Toscanini  was an Italian conductor. He was one of the most acclaimed musicians of the late 19th and 20th century. Toscanini was a prolific recording artist, having conducted many recordings from 1920 until his retirement in 1954.

Toscanini and recording
Toscanini made his first recordings in December 1920 with the La Scala Orchestra in the Trinity Church studio of the Victor Talking Machine Company in Camden, New Jersey and his last with the NBC Symphony Orchestra in June 1954 in Carnegie Hall. His entire catalog of commercial recordings was issued by RCA Victor, save for two single-sided recordings for Brunswick in 1926 (his first by the electrical process) with the New York Philharmonic Orchestra and a series of recordings with the BBC Symphony Orchestra from 1937 to 1939 for EMI's His Master's Voice label (Victor's European affiliate). Toscanini also recorded with the New York Philharmonic in Carnegie Hall for RCA Victor in 1929 and 1936. He later made a series of long-unissued recordings with the Philadelphia Orchestra for RCA Victor in Philadelphia's Academy of Music in 1941 and 1942. All the commercially issued RCA Victor and HMV recordings have been digitally remastered and reissued on compact disc. There are also recorded concerts with various European orchestras, especially with La Scala Orchestra and the Philharmonia Orchestra.

Toscanini disliked recording, especially the acoustic method, and for several years recorded only sporadically as a result. He was fifty-three years old when he made his first recordings in 1920 and didn't begin regular recording until 1938, after he became conductor of the NBC Symphony Orchestra at the age of seventy. As the recording process improved, so did Toscanini's negative attitude towards making records and he eventually became more interested in preserving his performances for posterity. The majority of Toscanini's recordings were made with the NBC Symphony, which was created expressly for him.  The NBCSO recordings, dating from 1937–1954, cover the bulk of his repertoire and document the final phase of his 68-year conducting career.

From 1990-1992, RCA reissued its entire Toscanini catalogue on compact disc, on the RCA Victor Gold Seal label.  This 71-volume issue covered 82 CDs and was remastered, whenever possible, from original sources.  Beginning in 1999, RCA reissued several of Toscanini's "high fidelity" recordings, made between 1949 and 1954, in newer remasterings. In 2012, Sony Masterworks, which now owns the RCA Victor archives, issued an 84-CD boxed set of Toscanini's complete RCA Victor recordings and the commercially issued HMV recordings with the BBC Symphony on the RCA Red Seal label. In 2013, EMI Classics issued a 6-CD set containing Toscanini's complete HMV recordings with the BBC Symphony Orchestra.
Recorded concerts with various European orchestras, especially with La Scala Orchestra and the Philharmonia Orchestra, have been issued on other labels. His retirement coincided with the first commercial stereophonic recordings. Only his final two NBC concerts, on March 21 and April 4, 1954, were recorded in stereo.

Toscanini's first recordings in 1920 were made at the precise midpoint of his conducting career (1886–1954), so they document Toscanini's conducting in the latter half of his career only.

Recording guides
A guide to Toscanini's recording career can be found in Mortimer H. Frank's "From the Pit to the Podium: Toscanini in America" in International Classical Record Collector (1998, 15 8-21) and Christopher Dyment's "Toscanini's European Inheritance" in International Classical Record Collector (1998, 15 22-8).   Frank and Dyment also discuss Maestro Toscanini's performance history in the 50th anniversary issue of Classic Record Collector (2006, 47) Frank with 'Toscanini - Myth and Reality' (10-14) and Dyment 'A Whirlwind in London' (15-21)   This issue also contains interviews with people who performed with Toscanini - Jon Tolansky 'Licia Albanese - Maestro and Me' (22-6) and 'A Mesmerising Beat: John Tolansky talks to some of those who worked with Arturo Toscanini, to discover some of the secrets of his hold over singers, orchestras and audiences.' (34-7).  There is also a feature article on Toscanini's interpretation of Brahms's First Symphony - Norman C. Nelson, 'First Among Equals [...] Toscanini's interpretation of Brahms's First Symphony in the context of others'  (28-33)

Mortimer Frank's Arturo Toscanini: The NBC Years (2002) contains an extensive discography as 'Appendix 8'. It is already a little dated, but it is still very useful. In addition to all discs from RCA's Toscanini Collection (Gold Seal) and The Immortal (Red Seal), many important broadcasts issued by Naxos, Music and Arts, Testament and others are also included. Caveat: all releases after 2002 are not included, and there is a fair amount of these; for instance, the five discs box-set with the complete Beethoven symphonies (RCA Red Seal). Also misleading is the listing of some old remasters on the Music and Arts label which are now available in better transfers; for instance, Tchaikovsky Manfred and Romeo and Juliet from  March 21, 1953, have been re-issued in 2004 as CD-4260, whereas the book gives only the old edition from 1987 (CD-260).

Albums
The discography below is not comprehensive, but rather representative. The listing only contains Compact Disc releases and does not contain 78rpm, LP, Cassette, or 8-track tape releases. In addition to recordings issued by the RCA label, it includes issues of rehearsals and broadcast performances on other labels.

References

External links
Very extensive online Toscanini discography

Toscanini, Arturo